Jean Hugonet (born 24 November 1999) is a French professional footballer who plays as a defender for Austria Lustenau.

Career statistics

Club

References

1999 births
Living people
French footballers
Association football defenders
Championnat National 3 players
Championnat National 2 players
2. Liga (Austria) players
Paris FC players
US Saint-Malo players
SC Austria Lustenau players
French expatriate footballers
French expatriate sportspeople in Austria
Expatriate footballers in Austria